The Georgia Southern Eagles football statistical leaders are individual statistical leaders of the Georgia Southern Eagles football program in various categories, including passing, rushing, receiving, total offense, defensive stats, and kicking. Within those areas, the lists identify single-game, single-season, and career leaders. The Eagles represent Georgia Southern University in the NCAA Division I FBS Sun Belt Conference.

Although Georgia Southern competed in intercollegiate football as early as 1924, the school dropped football after the 1940 season and did not reinstate the program until 1982, initially playing at club level until resuming varsity play in 1984. Because records from the 1924-1940 period are often incomplete and inconsistent, the school's record book only include players from 1982 on.

Recordkeeping notes:
 From 1984 through 2013, Georgia Southern played in the second level of Division I football, currently known as Division I FCS (known before the 2006 season as Division I-AA). Official NCAA season and career statistical totals do not include statistics recorded in I-AA/FCS playoff games before 2002, and most programs that played in FCS before 2002 follow this practice. Southern does not; its official single-season and career leaderboards incorporate statistics from all FCS playoff games. During their FCS tenure, the Eagles made the playoffs 19 times and played in 68 playoff games (with 43 of these games before 2002), giving many players in that era multiple extra games to amass statistics.
 The NCAA did not count bowl games toward official season statistics until 2002 (at that time, Southern was in what is now known as FCS). The Eagles have appeared in five bowl games since their first season of bowl eligibility in 2015, giving players in those seasons an extra game to amass statistics.
 The Sun Belt Conference has held a championship game since 2018; however, Southern has yet to appear in that game. 
 Due to COVID-19 issues, the NCAA ruled that the 2020 season would not count against the athletic eligibility of any football player, giving everyone who played in that season the opportunity for five years of eligibility instead of the normal four.

During much of their history, the Eagles have run an option offense, focused on running over passing. Therefore, the Eagles' passing records tend to be lower than at most other schools. Exceptions to this trend are the years 2006 through 2009, when the Eagles scrapped the option offense under head coaches Brian VanGorder and Chris Hatcher, and 2022, when new head coach Clay Helton installed a pro-style pass-oriented offense. Notably, Kyle Vantrease took only six games in 2022 to set a new single-season passing yardage record, and more than doubled the previous record by the end of the regular season. Despite only playing at Southern for one season (he had played at Buffalo in five seasons, with one redshirt season and an extra year of eligibility due to COVID-19), he is second on the team's career passing yardage list.

These lists are updated through the 2022 season.

Passing

Passing yards

Passing touchdowns

Rushing

Rushing yards

Rushing touchdowns

Receiving

Receptions

Receiving yards

Receiving touchdowns

Total offense
Total offense is the sum of passing and rushing statistics. It does not include receiving or returns. Georgia Southern's record book lists only the single-game leader; however, the previous single-game record was broken during the 2022 season.

Total offense yards

Touchdowns responsible for
"Touchdowns responsible for" is the official NCAA term for combined passing and rushing touchdowns. Georgia Southern's record book includes career and single-season leaders, but not single-game leaders.

Defense

Interceptions

Tackles

Sacks

Kicking

Field goals made

Field goal percentage

Footnotes

References

Georgia Southern